Roger Nolan is a former sergeant of the Baltimore Police Department's Homicide Unit. He is notable for being a Homicide Squad Supervisor, alongside fellow sergeants Terry McLarney and Jay Landsman, under the command of Lieutenant Gary D'Addario, whose work was featured in David Simon's Homicide: A Year on the Killing Streets book. A native of West Baltimore and a former Marine, Nolan joined the department in 1963  working in the State's Attorney's Unit,  and the Western, Eastern, and Northwestern Districts, before becoming a supervisor in the department's Homicide Unit.

Nolan retired a day before his 70th birthday in 2009.

References

African-American police officers
American police officers
Place of birth missing (living people)
Year of birth missing (living people)
Living people
Baltimore Police Department officers
21st-century African-American people